The Journal of Affective Disorders is a peer-reviewed medical journal covering research on all aspects of affective disorders. It is published by Elsevier and its editors-in-chief are P. Brambilla and J.C. Soares. It was established in 1979 and is the official journal of the International Society for Affective Disorders.

Abstracting and indexing 
The journal is abstracted and indexed in:

According to the Journal Citation Reports, the journal has a 2021 impact factor of 6.533

References

External links
 

Psychiatry journals
Mood disorders
Elsevier academic journals
Publications established in 1979
Biweekly journals
English-language journals